This is a list of ARIA club chart number-one hits from 2001, which is collected from Australian Recording Industry Association (ARIA) from weekly DJ reports.

Chart

Number-one artists

See also
ARIA Charts
List of number-one singles of 2001 (Australia)
List of number-one albums of 2001 (Australia)
2001 in music

References

2001 Club
Australia Club Chart
2001 in Australian music